Akiz Qeshlaq (also Romanized as Akīz Qeshlāq; also known as Akaz Qeshlāq and Akīz Qeshlāqī) is a village in Anguran Rural District, Anguran District, Mahneshan County, Zanjan Province, Iran. At the 2006 census, its population was 51, in 10 families.

References 

Populated places in Mahneshan County